Gina Wynbrandt is an American comic book artist and illustrator.

Background
Wynbrandt was born in Chicago, Illinois, in 1990. She is a graduate of Walter Payton College Prep and the School of the Art Institute of Chicago. She is the niece of comic book artist and software designer Mike Saenz.

Career
Wynbrandt was nominated for an Ignatz Award in 2015 for Promising New Talent, based on the work in her minicomic Big Pussy. Her first graphic novel Someone Please Have Sex With Me was published by 2dcloud in 2016.

In 2017, she was a featured guest at the Barcelona International Comic Fair and Comic Arts Brooklyn, and in 2018 she was a featured guest at the Chicago Alternative Comics Expo.

Her work has been featured in Best American Comics, VICE Media, Lumpen, and The Believer.

References

External links

American women cartoonists
American female comics artists
Alternative cartoonists
1990 births
Living people
American cartoonists
21st-century American women